{{Speciesbox
|image = Delias sambawana 248926808.jpg 
|image_caption = 
|taxon = Delias sambawana
|authority = Rothschild, 1894<ref>Rothschild, 1894
On five new Delias collected by William Doherty in the east Novit. Zool. 1 (4) : 661-662</ref>
|synonyms =Delias minerva Fruhstorfer, 1896
}}Delias sambawana is a butterfly in the family Pieridae. It was described by Walter Rothschild in 1894. It is found on the Wallace line.

The wingspan is about 60–65 mm. Adults are similar to Delias periboea and Delias fasciata, but larger.

SubspeciesD. s. sambawna (Sumbawa)D. s. minerva Fruhstorfer, 1896 (Lombok)D. S. everetti Rothschild, 1925 (Flores)D. s. boejanana Kalis, 1941 (Bali)D. s. kenta Nakano, 1991 (Alor)
 
References

External links
Delias at Markku Savela's Lepidoptera and Some Other Life Forms''

Butterflies described in 1894
sambawana